Leandro Henrique do Nascimento (born 10 November 1998), commonly known as Leandrinho, is a Brazilian professional footballer who plays as a forward for Red Bull Bragantino.

Club career
Born in Ribeirão Claro, Leandrinho made his debut for Ponte Preta on the 8th matchday of the 2015 Campeonato Brasileiro Série A against Fluminense being substituted on for Renato Cajá.

On 12 January 2017, he joined Serie A club Napoli on a reported four-year/$600,000 deal.

On 10 July 2018, Leandrinho joined Atlético Mineiro on a year-long loan deal.

On 28 February 2020, he joined Red Bull Bragantino on loan until 30 June 2020 with an option to purchase. On 12 August 2020, Red Bull Bragantino activated the option to purchase.

Honours

International
Brazil U-17
 South American U-17 Championship: 2015

Club
Ponte Preta
 Campeonato Brasileiro Série B: runner-up 2014

Individual
 South American U-17 Championship top scorer: 2015

References

1998 births
Living people
Sportspeople from Paraná (state)
Association football forwards
Brazilian footballers
Brazil youth international footballers
Campeonato Brasileiro Série A players
Campeonato Brasileiro Série B players
Associação Atlética Ponte Preta players
S.S.C. Napoli players
Clube Atlético Mineiro players
Red Bull Bragantino players
Brazilian expatriate footballers
Expatriate footballers in Italy